High harmonic generation (HHG) is a non-linear process during which a target (gas, plasma, solid or liquid sample) is illuminated by an intense laser pulse. Under such conditions, the sample will emit the high harmonics of the generation beam (above the fifth harmonic). Due to the coherent nature of the process, high harmonics generation is a prerequisite of attosecond physics.

Perturbative harmonic generation
Perturbative harmonic generation is a process whereby laser light of frequency ω and photon energy ħω can be used to generate new frequencies of light. The newly generated frequencies are integer multiples nω of the original light's frequency. This process was first discovered in 1961 by Franken et al., using a ruby laser, with crystalline quartz as the nonlinear medium.

Harmonic generation in dielectric solids is well understood and extensively used in modern laser physics (see second-harmonic generation). In 1967 New et al. observed the first third harmonic generation in a gas. In monatomic gases it is only possible to produce odd numbered harmonics for reasons of symmetry. Harmonic generation in the perturbative (weak field) regime is characterised by rapidly decreasing efficiency with increasing harmonic order. This behaviour can be understood by considering an atom absorbing n photons then emitting a single high energy photon. The probability of absorbing n photons decreases as n increases, explaining the rapid decrease in the initial harmonic intensities.

Development
The first high harmonic generation was observed in 1977 in interaction of intense CO2 laser pulses with plasma generated from solid targets. HHG in gases, far more widespread in application today, was first observed by McPherson and colleagues in 1987, and later by Ferray et al. in 1988, with surprising results: the high harmonics were found to decrease in intensity at low orders, as expected, but then were observed to form a plateau, with the intensity of the harmonics remaining approximately constant over many orders.
Plateau harmonics spanning hundreds of eV have been measured which extend into the soft X-ray regime. This plateau ends abruptly at a position called the high harmonic cut-off.

Properties
High harmonics have a number of interesting properties. They are a tunable table-top source of XUV/soft X-rays, synchronised with the driving laser and produced with the same repetition rate. The harmonic cut-off varies linearly with increasing laser intensity up until the saturation intensity Isat where harmonic generation stops. The saturation intensity can be increased by changing the atomic species to lighter noble gases but these have a lower conversion efficiency so there is a balance to be found depending on the photon energies required.

High harmonic generation strongly depends on the driving laser field and as a result the harmonics have similar temporal and spatial coherence properties. High harmonics are often generated with pulse durations shorter than that of the driving laser. This is due to the nonlinearity of the generation process, phase matching and ionization. Often harmonics are only produced in a very small temporal window when the phase matching condition is met. Depletion of the generating media due to ionization also means that harmonic generation is mainly confined to the leading edge of the driving pulse.

High harmonics are emitted co-linearly with the driving laser and can have a very tight angular confinement, sometimes with less divergence than that of the fundamental field and near Gaussian beam profiles.

Semi-classical approach
The maximum photon energy producible with high harmonic generation is given by the cut-off of the harmonic plateau. This can be calculated classically by examining the maximum energy the ionized electron can gain in the electric field of the laser. The cut-off energy is given by;

where Up is the ponderomotive energy from the laser field and Ip is the ionization potential.

This derivation of the cut-off energy is derived from a semi-classical calculation. The electron is initially treated quantum mechanically as it tunnel ionizes from the parent atom, but then its subsequent dynamics are treated classically. The electron is assumed to be born into the vacuum with zero initial velocity, and to be subsequently accelerated by the laser beam's electric field.

Half an optical cycle after ionization, the electron will reverse direction as the electric field changes, and will accelerate back towards the parent nucleus. Upon returning to the parent nucleus it can then emit bremsstrahlung-like radiation during a recombination process with the atom as it returns to its ground state. This description has become known as the recollisional model of high harmonic generation.

Since the frequency of the emitted radiation depends on both the kinetic energy and on the ionization potential, the different frequencies are emitted at different recombination time (i.e. the emitted pulse is chirped). What is more, for every frequency, there are two corresponding recombination times. We refer to these two trajectories as the short trajectory (which are emitted first), and the long trajectory.

Some interesting limits on the HHG process which are explained by this model show that HHG will only occur if the driving laser field is linearly polarised. Ellipticity on the laser beam causes the returning electron to miss the parent nucleus. Quantum mechanically, the overlap of the returning electron wavepacket with the nuclear wavepacket is reduced. This has been observed experimentally, where the intensity of harmonics decreases rapidly with increasing ellipticity. Another effect which limits the intensity of the driving laser is the Lorentz force. At intensities above 1016 Wcm−2 the magnetic component of the laser pulse, which is ignored in weak field optics, can become strong enough to deflect the returning electron. This will cause it to "miss" the parent nucleus and hence prevent HHG.

Phase matching
As in every nonlinear process, phase matching plays an important role in high harmonic generation in gas phase. The four causes of wave vector mismatch are: neutral dispersion, plasma dispersion, Gouy phase, and dipole phase.

The neutral dispersion is caused by the atoms while the plasma dispersion is due to the ions, and the two have opposite signs.
The Gouy phase is due to wavefront phase jump close to the focus, and varies along it. Finally the dipole phase arise from the atomic response in the HHG process.
When using a gas jet geometry, the optimal conditions for generating high harmonics emitted from short trajectories are obtained when the generating gas is located after the focus, while generation of high harmonics from long trajectory can be obtained off-axis when the generating gas is located before the focus.

Furthermore, the implementation of loose focusing geometry for the driving field enables a higher number of emitters and photons to contribute to the generation process and thus, enhance the harmonic yield.  
When using a gas jet geometry, focusing the laser into the Mach disk can increase the efficiency of harmonic generation.

See also
 Attosecond physics
 Nonlinear optics
 Photoionization
 Resonant high harmonic generation from laser ablated plasma plumes

References

Laser science
Nonlinear optics

External links 
 Commercial EUV Laser Systems with Tabletop Scale High Harmonic Generation Sources by KMLabs